wxSQLite3 is a C++ wrapper around the public domain SQLite 3.x database and is specifically designed for use in programs based on the wxWidgets library.

wxSQLite3 does not try to hide the underlying database, in contrary almost all special features of the current SQLite version 3.41.1 are supported, like for example the creation of user defined scalar or aggregate functions. Since SQLite stores strings in UTF-8 encoding, the wxSQLite3 methods provide automatic conversion between wxStrings and UTF-8 strings. This works best for the Unicode builds of wxWidgets. In ANSI builds the current locale conversion object (wxConvCurrent) is used for conversion to/from UTF-8. Special care has to be taken if external administration tools are used to modify the database contents, since not all of these tools operate in Unicode resp. UTF-8 mode.

Since version 1.7.0 optional support for key based database encryption (128-bit AES) is included. Starting with version 1.9.6 of wxSQLite3 the encryption extension is compatible with the SQLite amalgamation source and includes the extension functions module. Support for 256-bit AES encryption has been added in version 1.9.8.

Since version 3.5.0 the SQLite library is an integrated part of wxSQLite3.

Since version 4.0.0 wxSQLite3 supports to select the encryption scheme at runtime. In addition to the wxSQLite3 legacy schemes, AES-128 bit and AES-256 bit, three other encryption schemes, namely sqleet (aka ChaCha20 - Poly1305),  SQLCipher (aka AES-256 bit - SHA-1/SHA256/SHA512 - all SQLCipher variants from version 1 up to version 4 supported), and System.Data.SQLite (aka RC4) can be selected.

Since version 4.6.0 wxSQLite3 uses a separate implementation of the encryption extension, namely SQLite3 Multiple Ciphers, because the formerly used SQLITE_HAS_CODEC interface was removed from SQLite in February 2020.

See also
 Guayadeque Music Player – a free music player that employs wxSQLite3
 SQLite
 WxWidgets

References

External links
 
 Library for SQLite3 in Node.js based on wxSQLite3 resp SQLite3MultipleCiphers
 Java JDBC driver for SQLite with encryption support based on wxSQLite3 resp SQLite3MultipleCiphers
 wxWidgets

Relational database management systems
Software that uses wxWidgets
WxWidgets